Henri Kontinen and John Peers were the defending champions, but lost in the second round to Robert Lindstedt and Dominic Thiem.

Łukasz Kubot and Marcelo Melo won the title, defeating Jamie Murray and Bruno Soares in the final, 6–4, 6–2.

Seeds
All seeds received a bye into the second round.

Draw

Finals

Top half

Bottom half

References
 Main Draw

2018 ATP World Tour
Doubles